Kroll is a surname.

Kroll may also refer to:

 Kroll Inc., a risk consultancy and technology firm
 Kroll Opera House in Berlin
Kroll (film), a 1991 Polish film